The Tule Lake National Wildlife Refuge is a National Wildlife Refuge of the United States in northern California near the Oregon border. It is part of the Klamath Basin National Wildlife Refuge Complex, and is a crucial part of the Pacific Flyway corridor for migratory birds. 

The refuge was established in 1928 by President Calvin Coolidge to preserve habitat for birds and other animals. It is a staging area for migrating waterfowl such as the greater white-fronted goose, snow goose, Ross's goose, and cackling goose. The refuge's waterways are inhabited by endangered fish species such as the Lost River sucker and shortnose sucker.

Local habitat types include uplands vegetated with grasses and shrubs such as sagebrush, and wetlands such as marshes. The refuge also includes about 19,000 acres of cropland leased to growers. Crops include potato, onion, horseradish, alfalfa, and cereals.

Recreation opportunities and public services include wildlife viewing and photography, education, and hunting.

Gallery

See also 
 List of National Wildlife Refuges
 Volcanic Legacy Scenic Byway

References

External links 
 
 Tule Lake National Wildlife Refuge. USFWS.

National Wildlife Refuges in California
Protected areas of Modoc County, California
Protected areas of Siskiyou County, California
Modoc Plateau
Wetlands of California
Landforms of Siskiyou County, California